Avesnes-en-Bray (literally Avesnes in Bray) is a commune in the Seine-Maritime department in the Normandy region in northern France.

Geography

Population

Places of interest
 The eighteenth century church of St.Martin.
 Some Merovingian tombs and objects, found in the 19th century.

See also
Communes of the Seine-Maritime department

References

Communes of Seine-Maritime